The 2023 season is the inaugural season for St. Louis City SC. It will be the club's first season of existence, their first in the top-tier of American soccer, and their first season in Major League Soccer.

This is the first year since 1977 that a top division club from Greater St. Louis will be playing in the first tier of U.S. soccer, the last being the St. Louis Stars who played in the old North American Soccer League from 1968 until 1977, and the old National Professional Soccer League in 1967.

Outside of MLS play, St. Louis City will be participating in the U.S. Open Cup and the Leagues Cup tournaments.

Club

Roster

Transfers

In

Out

Competitions

Major League Soccer

Standings

Western Conference

Overall

Matches

U.S. Open Cup

Leagues Cup

Central 1

Statistics

Appearances and goals 
Numbers after plus-sign(+) denote appearances as a substitute.

|-

|-
!colspan="4"|Total
!0!!0!!0!!0!!0!!0!!0!!0!!0!!0

References

External links 
 St. Louis City SC

2023 Major League Soccer season
American soccer clubs 2023 season
2023 in sports in Missouri
St. Louis City SC